Akaki Tabutsadze (born 19 August 1997) is a Georgian rugby union player. He plays as Wing for Lelo Saracens in Georgia Championship Didi 10.

Biography 
Akaki Tabutsadze began his senior career with Lelo Saracens, where he still plays today. He participates in the 2017 junior rugby union world championship in Georgia with the Georgian selection. Then in the process, he joined the Georgia rugby sevens team participating in the Seven's Grand Prix Series 2017. He will be summoned again the following year. In the process, he was summoned with Georgia XV, for a summer tournament bringing together Racing 92, Argentina XV and Brazil. In early 2020, he was called up for the first time with the Georgia rugby union team, for a confrontation against Spain. Again called for the next match against Belgium, he scored a quadruple. He was subsequently included in the squad competing for the Autumn Nations Cup.

References

1997 births
Living people
Rugby union players from Georgia (country)
Lelo Saracens players
The Black Lion players
Rugby union wings